Dusan Predrag Djuric (born 16 September 1984) is a Swedish professional footballer who plays as a midfielder. Starting off his career with Halmstads BK in Sweden, he went on to play professionally in Switzerland, Denmark, and France before returning to Sweden in 2016. He won eight caps for the Sweden national team between 2005 and 2010.

Club career

Early career
Starting his career in Halmstads BK youth team, he was raised up to the senior team in 2003 and debuted against GIF Sundsvall in the premier game of the season, coming on as a substitute. Prior to the 2004 season, he had established himself as a player in the starting line-up and aided the club to become runner-up, two points behind Malmö FF. Djuric continued on as a starting player during the poor season of 2005, as Halmstads BK qualified for the 2005–06 UEFA Cup group stage, in which Djuric became the only goalscorer for the club, against Sampdoria. During the following seasons he started mainly as a midfielder but gradually stept up to become a forward.

Zürich
Following the UEFA Cup in 2005, Djuric attracted the attention of bigger clubs in Europe, such as Sporting CP, Real Sociedad and Anderlecht, however, he signed a contract with Swiss club Zürich on 7 January 2008.

Djuric gained somewhat instant glory at Zürich, following a goal against Milan on San Siro in the 2008–09 UEFA Cup first round, however, Milan won both matches with 4–1 totally. Djuric helpt Zürich win the 2008–09 season and then scored twice during the qualification rounds to the 2009–10 UEFA Champions League. Djuric playing in Zürich didn't go unnoticed and it was soon speculation once again that he would move to various clubs, among them Fiorentina, Montpellier and Valenciennes.

Valenciennes
On 13 January 2012, Valenciennes confirmed that they had signed him on a three-and a half-year-contract. After struggling with injuries, he joined Danish club Odense on loan for the 2013–14 season.

Aarau
At the end of the 2013–14 season, Djuric signed a one-year deal for Swiss club FC Aarau for an undisclosed fee.

Dalkurd FF
Ahead of the 2016 Superettan season, Djuric signed for Dalkurd FF where he ended up playing 20 games and scoring 2 goals.

GAIS 
In 2017, Djuric signed for the Superettan club GAIS. Djuric left GAIS at the end of the 2018 season.

Return to Halmstads BK
On 26 February 2019, Djuric returned to Halmstads BK on a contract until the end of 2020.

International career

Youth
Djuric made his debut for Sweden's U-21 team in 2004 against Portugals U-21 team on 17 February. He was also part of Sweden's squad to the 2004 UEFA European U-21 Championship, which ended in 4th place.

Senior
Djuric where called up to Sweden's national team prior to its January tour in United States in 2005, being placed on the bench against South Korea, he came on as a substitute against Mexico.

Personal life
Of Serb descent, his parents are from Loznica, Serbia.

Honours
FC Zürich
Swiss Super League: 2008–09

References

External links

 
 

1984 births
Living people
Swedish people of Serbian descent
Swedish footballers
Swedish expatriate footballers
Sweden international footballers
Sweden under-21 international footballers
GAIS players
Dalkurd FF players
Halmstads BK players
FC Zürich players
Valenciennes FC players
Odense Boldklub players
FC Aarau players
Expatriate footballers in Switzerland
Expatriate footballers in France
Sportspeople from Halmstad
Allsvenskan players
Superettan players
Swiss Super League players
Ligue 1 players
Serb diaspora sportspeople
Association football midfielders
Sportspeople from Halland County